Scales Mound is a village and a township in Jo Daviess County, Illinois, in the United States:

 Scales Mound, Illinois
 Scales Mound Township, Jo Daviess County, Illinois